Wemyss can refer to:

Places 
 Wemyss, Fife, a civil parish on the south coast of Fife, Scotland, lying on the Firth of Forth.
 Wemyss Bay, a large village in Inverclyde, Scotland
 Wemyss Bay railway station, a terminus on the Inverclyde Line
 Castle Wemyss, a demolished mansion in Wemyss Bay, Scotland
 East Wemyss, a village on the south coast of Fife, Scotland
 Wemyss Castle, a castle in Wemyss on the cliffs between East and West Wemyss
 Wemyss Cave, a cave in Fife, Scotland, where very early prehistoric art was found
 West Wemyss, a village on the north shore of the Firth of Forth, in Fife, Scotland

People 
 Clan Wemyss, a Lowland Scottish clan
 Earl of Wemyss and March, two titles in the Peerage of Scotland held by a joint holder since 1826
 James Wemyss (disambiguation), multiple people
 John Wemyss (disambiguation), multiple people
 Kathy Wemyss, an Australian rock musician
 Mary Wemyss (1868–1951), an English novelist 
 Rosslyn Wemyss, 1st Baron Wester Wemyss (1864–1933), a British officer of the Royal Navy
 Wemyss Mackenzie Simpson (1824-1894), a Canadian fur-trader and political figure
 Yuan Wemyss (born 1976), China-born Scottish badminton player

Other 
 Wemyss Ware, a type of pottery
 Wemys, a character's middle name in Lord of the Flies

See also
 Weems (disambiguation)